The Social Stratification Research Seminar (UK) is an annual research colloquium for original, empirically informed sociological presentations on social stratification. The Social Stratification Research Seminars have been running almost every autumn since 1968. The seminars have mainly been hosted at the University of Cambridge and were often organised by the Social Science Research Group (formerly the Sociological Research Group). The seminars have also been held at the University of Cardiff (2003-5), the University of Edinburgh (2014, 2017), the University of Milan (2015), the University of Stirling (2007, 2011) and Utrecht University (2010).

The original movers and shakers behind the seminar were three distinguished British scholars working in the field of social stratification - Professor Robert (Bob) Blackburn,  Professor Ken Prandy, and Professor Alexander (Sandy) Stewart. Since the early part of this millennium the seminar has been organised by Professor Paul Lambert, who is Professor of Sociology at the University of Stirling and a longstanding fan of Stirling Albion F.C. The annual call for papers is usually issued in the spring and the seminar is usually held on two consecutive days in the early September. Proposals for papers for presentations are invited from any area of research into social stratification and social inequality.  The organizers do not usually limit the number of delegates attending. There are no parallel sessions and therefore there is an upper limit on the number of paper presentations that can be accommodated.

A salient feature of the Social Stratification Research Seminars has been how to appropriately measure social stratification in contemporary societies. An approach that has been developed by researchers who are regular contributors to the seminars are Social Interaction and Stratification Scales. This approach is the foundation of the CAMSIS Project which is an internationally comparative assessment of the structures of social interaction and stratification across a number of countries.

A number of prominent research publications contain work that was developed and showcased at the seminars. These works include an edited volume entitled Social stratification:Trends and processes, and special issues of the journal Contemporary Social Science and the International Journal of Sociology and Social Policy .

Notable sociological scholars in the field of social stratification who have attended the Social Stratification Research Seminars include Professor Harry Ganzeboom, Dr Wendy Bottero, Professor Geoff Payne, Professor Max Bergman, and Professor Lucinda Platt. The meeting is also attended by early career researchers such as Jennifer Ferguson.

References 

Science conferences
1968 establishments in the United Kingdom
Social sciences organizations